Francis Emroy Warren (June 20, 1844November 24, 1929) was an American politician of the Republican Party best known for his years in the United States Senate representing Wyoming and being the first Governor of Wyoming. A soldier in the Union Army during the American Civil War, he was the last veteran of that conflict to serve in the U.S. Senate.

Early life and military service
Warren was born on June 20, 1844, in Hinsdale, Berkshire County, Massachusetts, the son of Cynthia Estella (Abbott) and Joseph Spencer Warren. He grew up attending common schools and his local Hinsdale Academy.

During the civil war, Warren served in the 49th Massachusetts Infantry as a noncommissioned officer. At the age of nineteen at the siege of Port Hudson, Warren received the Medal of Honor for battlefield gallantry. His entire platoon was destroyed by Confederate bombardment and Warren, taking a serious scalp wound, disabled the artillery. Warren later served as a captain in the Massachusetts Militia.

Medal of Honor citation

Rank and Organization: Corporal, Company C, 49th Massachusetts Infantry.

Place and Date: At Port Hudson, La., May 27, 1863.

Entered Service At: Hinsdale, Mass.

Birth: Hinsdale, Mass.

Date Of Issue: September 30, 1893.

Citation:
Volunteered in response to a call, and took part in the movement that was made upon the enemy's works under a heavy fire therefrom in advance of the general assault.

Personal life

Francis E. Warren married Helen Smith, a woman from Massachusetts, although all of their married life until his first election to the United States Senate, in 1890, was spent in Wyoming. They had two children, a daughter, Helen Frances, and a son, Frederick Emory. Mrs. Warren was the president of church, literary and charitable societies of Cheyenne, vice-president of the Foundling Hospital, and Daughter of the American Revolution.

Business and politics
Following the civil war, Warren engaged in farming and stock-raising in Massachusetts before moving to Wyoming (then part of the Territory of Dakota) in 1868. Settling in Cheyenne, Warren engaged in real estate, mercantile business, livestock raising and the establishment of Cheyenne's first lighting system, becoming quite wealthy.

Warren's political work included: member, Wyoming Territorial Senate (1873–1874, 1884–1885), serving as senate president; member, Cheyenne City Council (1873–1874); treasurer of Wyoming (1876, 1879, 1882, 1884); and Mayor of Cheyenne (1885).

In February 1885, Warren was appointed Governor of the Territory of Wyoming by President Chester A. Arthur, although he was removed by Democratic President Grover Cleveland in November 1886. He was reappointed by President Benjamin Harrison in April 1889, and served until 1890, when he was elected first Governor of Wyoming (October 11, 1890 – November 24, 1890).

Senate years and death
In November 1890, Warren resigned as governor, having been elected to the United States Senate as a Republican, serving until March 4, 1893. He then resumed his former business pursuits before returning to the Senate (March 4, 1895–November 24, 1929). Warren chaired the following Senate Committees:
- Committee on Irrigation and Reclamation of Arid Lands
- Committee on Claims
- Committee on Irrigation
- Committee on Military Affairs
- Committee on Public Buildings and Grounds
- Committee on Agriculture and Forestry
- Committee on Appropriations
- Committee on Engrossed Bills

Warren died on November 24, 1929, in Washington, D.C. His funeral service was held in the United States Senate chamber. At the time of his death, he had served longer than any other U.S. senator.

Legacy
F. E. Warren Air Force Base in Cheyenne, Wyoming is named after Warren.  Additionally, Warren's daughter married then-Captain John J. Pershing in 1905. Several years later, President Theodore Roosevelt promoted Pershing from captain to brigadier general over 900 senior officers. Pershing's wife and three daughters were later killed during a fire at the Presidio in San Francisco. Warren was also the first senator to hire a female staffer and, as appropriations chairman during World War I, he was instrumental in funding the American efforts. Warren and his second wife, Clara LaBarron Morgan, bought the Nagle Warren Mansion in April 1910, and their dining room hosted people such as presidents Teddy Roosevelt and William Howard Taft. This mansion is now listed on the National Register of Historic Places. In 1958, he was inducted into the Hall of Great Westerners of the National Cowboy & Western Heritage Museum.

See also

List of Medal of Honor recipients
List of American Civil War Medal of Honor recipients: T–Z
 National Irrigation Congress
 List of United States Congress members who died in office (1900–49)

References

External links
 Francis E. Warren Papers at University of Wyoming - American Heritage Center
 AHC Digital Collection Francis E. Warren
 AHC blog: Wyoming Statehood: A load of "blatherskitism"?

 Retrieved on 2008-02-01

United States Army Medal of Honor recipients
Republican Party governors of Wyoming
1844 births
1929 deaths
People of Massachusetts in the American Civil War
Union Army non-commissioned officers
Members of the Wyoming Territorial Legislature
19th-century American politicians
Governors of Wyoming Territory
Republican Party United States senators from Wyoming
American Civil War recipients of the Medal of Honor
Massachusetts Republicans
People from Hinsdale, Massachusetts
Presidents of the National Rifle Association
Mayors of Cheyenne, Wyoming
Massachusetts militia